The Church of Saint-Pierre d'Aulnay (French: Église Saint-Pierre d'Aulnay) is an important Medieval church on the way to Saint-Jacques de Compostelle, in Aulnay, Charente-Maritime. The Church is thought to have been built in 1120–1140.

Numerous oriental influences can be seen in its designs. For example, the first arc of the gate is inspired from Oriental designs. Designs of elephants also find their origin in Oriental designs.

Numerous mouldings of the Church are visible at the Cité de l'Architecture et du Patrimoine in Paris.

Notes

External links
 Description of a portal of church of Saint-Pierre in 3D .

Roman Catholic churches in France